is a private junior and senior high school in Shinjuku, Tokyo.

 was established in 1923 and became  in 1948. It adopted its current name and form in 2009.

References

External links
 Mejiro Kenshin Junior and Senior High School
 
 Mejiro Kenshin Junior and Senior High School 

Private schools in Japan
High schools in Tokyo
Shinjuku
1923 establishments in Japan
Educational institutions established in 1923